Alexander Merkx (born 20 March 1994) is a Dutch darts player who competes in Professional Darts Corporation events.

Career
He made his PDC European Tour debut in the 2019 Dutch Darts Masters, but lost 6-1 Glen Durrant of England. In 2022 Merkx starting playing in the WDF Circuit and has begun to climb the rankings and has won 2 titles the Lithuania Open & Helvetia Open as he looks set to qualify for the WDF World Championships.

World Championship results

WDF
 2023:

References

External links

1994 births
Living people
Professional Darts Corporation associate players
Dutch darts players
21st-century Dutch people